Les Moitiers-d'Allonne is a commune in the Manche department in Normandy in north-western France

See also
Communes of the Manche department

References

Moitiersdallonne